Werner Klaas (10 May 1914 – between 30 March and 4 April 1945) was a German international footballer.

Personal life
Klaas served as an Oberleutnant (senior lieutenant) in the German Army during the Second World War. He was killed in action on the Eastern Front between 30 March and 4 April 1945.

References

External links
 
 

1914 births
1945 deaths
Association football defenders
German footballers
Germany international footballers
German Army personnel killed in World War II
German Army officers of World War II
People from Olpe (district)
Sportspeople from Arnsberg (region)
Footballers from North Rhine-Westphalia
Military personnel from North Rhine-Westphalia